Sezgi Sena Akay (born 31 October 1994) is a Turkish actress, former professional volleyball player, presenter, and model who was crowned Best Model of the World 2012. She is the youngest and 42nd titleholder in the pageant's history and the fourth woman from Turkey to win Best Model of the World. She previously won Best Model of Turkey 2012. She began her modelling career in Paris.

She started playing volleyball at a very young age. She played for Galatasaray S.K. for five years and later for Fenerbahçe S.K. Women's under-18 Volleyball Team for a year.

In 2014, she played Nevin Karatay in the Kanal D romantic drama and thriller series Zeytin Tepesi. Her role Nevin Karatay was equivalent to that of Elena Monforte in the original Italian version Le tre rose di Eva. In 2015, she hosted the Magazin Postası programme on FOX. Between 2015 and 2016, she was cast as lead character in SHOW TV drama series Acı Aşk (Turkish: Bitter Love), an adaptation of the South Korean television series Bad Love (2007–2008). Since January 2017, she portrays Murad IV's Imperial consort Sanavber in the second season of the Historical drama series Muhteşem Yüzyıl: Kösem (Turkish: The Magnificent Century: Kösem) broadcast on FOX.

Early life and education
Sezgi Sena Akay was born on 31 October 1994 in Istanbul, to Circassian parents. She has no siblings. After graduating from Erenköy Girls' High School, she enrolled in the Department of Public Relations and Publicity, Faculty of Communication, at Yeditepe University.

Sports career
She started playing volleyball at a very young age. She played for Galatasaray S.K. for five years and later for Fenerbahçe S.K. Women's under-18 Volleyball Team for a year.

Pageantry

Best Model of Turkey
Sezgi Sena Akay competed in the 25th Best Model of Turkey pageant and won the title "Best Model of Turkey 2012" on 15 December 2012. The event was held on the Galatasaray Islet (Suada) in Istanbul.

One of the lead judges of the competition, fashion designer Yıldırım Mayruk, stated that Sezgi Sena Akay is "the most beautiful and fresh model of the last twenty-five years".

Best Model of the World
She represented her nation, Turkey, at the Best Model of the World 2012 pageant, which was held on 10 December 2012, where she was crowned Best Model of the World 2012 and the Belgian representative became the first runner-up. This is the fourth time a Turkish woman has won the Best Model of the World crown.

At the age of 17, she stood 5 feet 11.3 inches (1.81 m) tall and weighted 121 lbs (55 kg). She grew 1.2 inches (three centimetres) taller in two years and stands 6 feet 0.5 inches (1.84 m).

Acting career
Her debut role was in the 2014 television drama Zeytin Tepesi which was shot in Ayvalık, Balıkesir. Her role Nevin Karatay was equivalent to that of Elena Monforte in the original Italian version Le tre rose di Eva.

In 2015, she hosted the Magazin Postası programme on FOX.

Between 2015 and 2016, she was cast as lead character Melek Yılmaz Köklükaya in SHOW TV drama series Acı Aşk (Turkish: Bitter Love), an adaptation of the South Korean television series Bad Love (2007–2008). She also played violin in the series.

Since January 2017, she portrays Murad IV's Imperial consort Sanavber in the second season of the historical drama series Muhteşem Yüzyıl: Kösem (Turkish: The Magnificent Century: Kösem) broadcast on FOX.

Filmography

Television

Awards and nominations

References

External links
 

1995 births
21st-century Turkish actresses
Best Model of the World winners
Best Model of Turkey winners
Erenköy Girls High School alumni
Fenerbahçe volleyballers
Galatasaray S.K. (women's volleyball) players
Living people
Models from Istanbul
Turkish beauty pageant winners
Turkish female models
Turkish people of Circassian descent
Turkish television actresses
Turkish television presenters
Turkish women's volleyball players
Yeditepe University alumni
Turkish women television presenters
Actresses from Istanbul
Volleyball players from Istanbul